Greg Andrew Lambert (born 4 January 1980, Stoke-on-Trent, Staffordshire, England) is an English first-class cricketer.  Lambert is a right-handed batsman who bowled right-arm medium pace.

Lambert represented the Yorkshire Cricket Board in a single List A match against Buckinghamshire in the 1999 NatWest Trophy.  In his only List A match, he took 2 wickets at a bowling average of 11.00, with figures of 2/22.

In 2000, played two first-class matches for Yorkshire against Surrey and Kent in the County Championship.  In those matches, he scored six runs at a batting average of 6.00, with a high score of 3*.  In the field he took a single catch.  With the ball he took four wickets at a bowling average of 33.25, with best figures of 2 for 62.

References

External links
Greg Lambert at Cricinfo
Greg Lambert at CricketArchive

1980 births
Living people
Cricketers from Stoke-on-Trent
English cricketers
Yorkshire Cricket Board cricketers
Yorkshire cricketers